Voodoo lily is a common name for several plants and may refer to:

Amorphophallus, a genus of some 170 tropical and subtropical tuberous herbaceous plants of the Arum family
Dracunculus vulgaris or dragon arum, a native of Europe
Sauromatum venosum, is a common shade loving house or garden plant